Lyman Morgan (April 23, 1814September 17, 1896) was an American Democratic politician.  He represented Ozaukee County for ten years in the Wisconsin State Senate (1865–1873 and 1879–1881).

Biography

Lyman Morgan was born in Wyoming County, Pennsylvania.  He was educated there and was trained in manufacturing.  He came to the Wisconsin Territory in 1847—the year before its admission to the Union—and settled at Port Washington, where he resided for the rest of his life.  He was elected to the Wisconsin State Senate from the 3rd senatorial district in 1864 and was re-elected in 1866, 1868 and 1870.  In 1872, the legislative redistricting enacted in 1871 (1871 Wis. Act 156) moved him into the 33rd district.  He did not run for re-election in 1872, but was elected again from the 33rd district in 1878.  In addition to his terms in the senate, Morgan was chairman of the Town Board of Supervisors of Port Washington.

Morgan died on September 17, 1896, at his home in Port Washington and was interred at the city's Union Cemetery.

References

External links
 

1814 births
1896 deaths
People from Wyoming County, Pennsylvania
People from Port Washington, Wisconsin
Mayors of places in Wisconsin
Democratic Party Wisconsin state senators
19th-century American politicians